, fanservice or , is material in a work of fiction or in a fictional series that is intentionally added to please the audience, often sexual in nature, such as nudity. The term originated in Japanese in the anime and manga fandom, but has been used in other languages and media. It is about "servicing" the fan – giving the fans "exactly what they want." Fan service can also refer (by means of text, symbol, image, sound) to other stories that contain visual elements.

When anime and manga were translated into English by U.S. companies, the original work was often edited to remove some of the fan service, making it more appropriate for U.S. audiences. Mike Tatsugawa explained this change as a result of a difference between cultural values of Japan and the U.S, though this practice has since become less common and poorly regarded by anime fans. In fact, some import licences have little more than fan service as their selling point.

Today, especially outside anime and manga, the term has expanded to hold a wider meaning. This includes any elements, be it visual nods, referencing older or forgotten media related to material, plot detours or otherwise, that are not needed by the actual plot or character development, but are included as nods to, or pandering to the long-term fans of the material, especially in context of sequels or prequels, or later seasons of series.

History
The 1952 French film Manina, la fille sans voiles (Manina, the Girl Without Sails) was not imported into the United States until 1958 after the success of the film's star, Brigitte Bardot, in that country. In the US, the film was renamed "Manina, the Girl in the Bikini" to highlight the appeal of the star and her revealing outfit (then a matter of controversy), despite her not appearing in the first 40 minutes of the 76 minute film.

Keith Russell regards the beginning of modern fan service as taking place in a permissive context, when "kids were just doing kids' stuff", which he believes allowed authors some latitude in regards to their subject matter. Beginning in the 1970s with Cutey Honey and continuing later with other magical girl shows, fan service in manga became more risqué. By the 1980s, full frontal nudity and shower scenes became standard content for anime and manga fan service. In the West, obscenity laws and rating systems (such as the Comics Code Authority in the United States or the MPAA rating system, which replaced the Hays Code for film ratings) prevent or limit unnecessary displays of nudity in films and comic books. Bikini shots and topless scenes were still popular forms of audience arousal. In the 1983 film Return of the Jedi, Carrie Fisher portrayed the character of Princess Leia wearing a metal bikini and chains while enslaved to the gangster Jabba the Hutt. This was an attempt to feminize the character and appeal to boys' fantasies. Some critics say that by portraying Leia as the object of desire to a crude monster, the film is reflecting the crude fantasies of its audience.

Types
Long shots of robots in mecha shows, sexual elements, violent episode-long fight scenes and emphasis on shipping can all be considered fan service as they are specifically aimed at pleasing the fans of any given show. Christian McCrea feels that Gainax is particularly good at addressing otaku through fan service by adding many "meta-references" and by showing "violence and hyperphysical activity". Baseball teams provide events that are described in Japan as fan service, such as dance shows, singing the team song or a performance by the team mascot.

The typical, but not only, variety of fan service in anime or manga is racy, sexual or erotic content, such as nudity and other forms of eye candy (for example, maid costumes). Fan service is especially common in shounen manga (aimed at boys). In shounen manga, pin-up girl style images are common "in varying states of undress", often using an "accidental exposure" excuse to show a favourite female character or an upskirt "glimpse of a character's panties". Series aimed at an older audience include more explicit fan service. Jiggling breasts, known as the "Gainax bounce", are an example of fan service, created as a way to make a scene of the Daicon IV opening video a bit more "H". The "bounce" was taken up by other animators, including the creators of the hentai series Cream Lemon. Shower scenes are very common in movies and in anime of the 1980s and 1990s, whereas many more recent TV series use trips to onsen (Japanese hot springs) or trips to tropical locales (or in some cases a swimming pool) in order to showcase the characters in bathing suits. Series aimed at males can also include fan service for women, as an attempt to court a wider audience.

Keith Russell defines fan service as "the random and gratuitous display of a series of anticipated gestures common in Manga and Anime. These gestures include such things as panty shots, leg spreads and glimpses of breast". Russell regards fan service as being an aesthetic of the transient "glimpse", which he contrasts with the gaze, as it takes the mind unaware and open to "libidinous possibility" without mediation. He considers the fan service object to be reassuring in its unrealistic nature and to be confirming the "freedom of desire".

Shoujo manga, aimed at female readers, also includes fan service, such as showing male characters "half-naked and in enticing poses". Robin Brenner notes that in the US comics culture, fan service aimed at women is rare, and also that in Japan, series can be famous for their fan service content.  Chris Beveridge explains this mindset with Agent Aika: "There's some sort of plot in there, but that's not the reason you're watching it. ... we're watching this for the sheer amount of fanservice." Male homoeroticism, such as accidental kisses, is a common feature of fan service for women and has been described as "easier to get away with" in terms of censorship than fan service for males. In the Boys' Love genre, fan service is "artwork or scenes" in products that "depict canonical characters in a homosocial / homoerotic context". Shoujo manga series may eroticise its female leads as well for crossover appeal, as fan service aimed at a potential male audience.

Brenner notes that fan service can be offputting to teen readers, as in a male reading shoujo manga or a female reading shounen manga and that in general fan service is more criticised when it features a female character. She cites Tenjo Tenge as an example of a fan service–laden series. When the series was localised, a large amount of this fan service was removed, leading to outcry from fans.

See also

 Adult animation
 Bad girl art
 Cartoon pornography
 Cameo appearance
 Doujinshi
 Easter egg (media)
 Ecchi
 Exploitation film
 Good girl art
 Item Number
 Meta-reference
 Nudity in film
 Scopophilia
 Sexposition

References

Further reading
 
 

Anime and manga terminology
Service